Lot 6 is a township in Prince County, Prince Edward Island, Canada.  It is part of Egmont Parish. Lot 6 was awarded to William Crowle in the 1767 land lottery.

Communities

Incorporated municipalities:

 O'Leary

Civic address communities:

 Carleton
 Cascumpec
 Coleman
 Forestview
 Fortune Cove
 Howlan
 Knutsford
 Mount Royal
 O'Leary
 Roxbury
 Unionvale
 West Devon
 Woodstock

References

06
Geography of Prince County, Prince Edward Island